Montia is a genus of plants in the family Montiaceae. Species in this genus are known generally as miner's lettuce or water chickweed. All of the species in the genus have edible leaves. It is found worldwide, except in Asia.

Montias are known from fossilized seeds recovered from sediments of the Pleistocene Tomales Formation and from a small paleoflora at San Bruno. Further, Daniel Axelrod discussed Montia howellii as one of the biogeographically significant species comprising the Millerton paleoflora at Tomales.

The genus name of Montia is in honour of Giuseppe Monti (1682–1760), an Italian chemist and botanist. It was first described and published in Sp. Pl. on page 87 in 1753.

Montia perfoliata, now Claytonia perfoliata, the species for which the term miner's lettuce was coined, is distributed throughout the Mountain West of North America in moist soils and prefers areas which have been recently disturbed. The species got its name due to its use as a fresh salad green by miners in the 1849 California Gold Rush.

Selected species:
Montia australasica - white purslane
Montia bostockii - Bostock's miner's lettuce
Montia chamissoi - water miner's lettuce, toadlily
Montia dichotoma - dwarf miner's lettuce
Montia diffusa - spreading miner's lettuce, branching montia
Montia fontana - annual water miner's lettuce, water-blinks
Montia howellii - Howell's miner's lettuce
Montia linearis - narrowleaf miner's lettuce
Montia parvifolia - littleleaf miner's lettuce

References

External links

 
Caryophyllales genera
Plants described in 1753